Viva Dead Ponies (originally titled "Bugs Fucking Bunny" ) is the second album by The Fatima Mansions, and features elements of both their original, more synth-led and melodic sound on songs such as "You're a Rose", as well as the noisier, guitar-oriented style that would become more prominent in their later works (a notable example of this being "Look What I Stole for Us, Darling").

As with their later album Lost in the Former West, the American release of Viva Dead Ponies featured a different track list, removing the poppy "Thursday" and adding "Only Losers Take the Bus" and "Blues for Ceausescu".  In 2007, Kitchenware and Sony BMG Music Entertainment reissued it as a 2-CD set, with a remastered version of the album on CD 1 and a career-spanning compilation on CD 2.

Track listing 
All songs written by Cathal Coughlan, unless otherwise indicated.

Correct track list (affecting tracks 12-14) given above.  For the LP releases, Side 1 was tracks 1-11, while Side 2 was 12-19.

Correct track list (affecting tracks 13-15) given above.  For the LP and cassette releases, Side 1 was tracks 1-11, while Side 2 was 12-20.  14 crops "I'm" from the opening lyric "I'm attacking the ones who are weakest of all."  16 is the re-recorded version from the "Hive" EP.
2007 reissue (Kitchenware/Sony BMG Music Entertainment—88697145932 (2CD, UK))

12 combines the two separate tracks at last, crops all the silence between the two parts, and starts the second part with "I'm attacking...".  "Farewell Oratorio" is uncredited, but is still the intro of 13.  14 is the re-recorded version from the "Hive" EP.

5 edits out the spoken word introduction.  "Into Thinner Air" is a hidden bonus track.

Personnel 
 Cathal Coughlan – vocals, keyboards, programming
 Andrías Ó Grúama – guitar
 Nick Bunker – keyboards
 Hugh Bunker – bass guitar
 Nicholas Tiompan Allum – drums, wind
with:
Kenny Davis - accordion
Alison Jiear - additional vocals
Lawrence Bogle - cover illustration

Sources

1990 albums
The Fatima Mansions albums